Miras Aubakirov (born 20 October 1996) is a Kazakhstani water polo player. He competed in the men's tournament at the 2020 Summer Olympics.

References

External links
 

1996 births
Living people
Kazakhstani male water polo players
Olympic water polo players of Kazakhstan
Water polo players at the 2020 Summer Olympics
People from East Kazakhstan Region
Asian Games gold medalists for Kazakhstan
Asian Games medalists in water polo
Water polo players at the 2018 Asian Games
Medalists at the 2018 Asian Games
21st-century Kazakhstani people